António Abrantes Mendes (2 May 1907, in Lisbon – 25 January 1987, in Lisbon) was a Portuguese footballer who played as a forward.

External links 
 

1907 births
1987 deaths
Footballers from Lisbon
Portuguese footballers
Association football forwards
Primeira Liga players
Sporting CP footballers
Portugal international footballers